The Dramatic Life of Abraham Lincoln is a 1924 American feature film directed by Phil Rosen and written by Frances Marion. By the date of release, the film's title was shortened to Abraham Lincoln, since the previous title was regarded as cumbersome.

Cast
George A. Billings as Abraham Lincoln
Danny Hoy as Lincoln as a boy
Ruth Clifford as Ann Rutledge
Irene Hunt as Nancy Hanks Lincoln
Fay McKenzie as Sarah Lincoln
Westcott Clarke as Thomas Lincoln
Charles K. French as Isom Enlow
William J. Humphrey as Stephen A. Douglas
A. Edward Sutherland as William Scott (billed as Eddie Sutherland)
Louise Fazenda as Sally
William F. Moran as John Wilkes Booth
Walter Rogers as Gen. Ulysses S. Grant
James Welch as Gen. Robert E. Lee
Willis Marks as Secretary of State William H. Seward
Fred Kohler as New Orleans slave auctioneer
Pat Hartigan as Jack Armstrong
Otis Harlan as Denton Offutt
Jules Hanft as James Rutledge
Julia Hesse as Mrs. Rutledge 
Robert Bolder as country politician
William McIllwain as Dr. Allen
Robert Milasch as Southern planter
George Reehm as Southern planter
Genevieve Blinn as Mrs. Ninian Edwards, Mary’s sister
Mickey Moore as Willie Lincoln
Newton Hall as Tad Lincoln
Francis Powers as Richard J. Oglesby
Homer Willits as John Hay, Lincoln’s secretary
Jim Blackwell as Tom
Frances Raymond as Scott’s mother
Jack Rollings as Union sentry
Merrill McCormick as corporal of the guard (billed as William McCormick)
Frank Newburg as Bixby
W. John Steppling as delegation chairman
Wanda Crazer as dancer
Alfred Allen as General George Meade
Miles McCarthy as Major/General Robert Anderson
Earl Schenck as Colonel Henry Rathbone
Dolly McLean as Miss Harris
Cordelia Callahan as Mrs. Surratt
Dallas Hope as stable boy
Dick Johnson as bartender
Jack Winn as Ned Spangler
Lawrence Grant as actor at Ford’s Theatre
Ivy Livingston as actress at Ford’s Theatre
Kathleen Chambers as actress at Ford’s Theatre 
Henry Rattenberry as stagehand
W. L. McPheeters as Secret Service Chief Allan Pinkerton
Nick Cogley as Secretary of War Simon Cameron
Charles Smiley as Secretary of the Treasury Salmon P. Chase
R. G. Dixon as Secretary of the Navy Gideon Welles
Harry Kelsey as Secretary of the Interior Caleb B. Smith
Joseph S. Mills as Postmaster-General Montgomery Blair  
Fred Manly as Attorney-General Edward Bates
William von Hardenburg as Attorney-General James Speed
R. J. Duston as Postmaster-General William Dennison, Jr.

Awards
The movie won the Photoplay Medal of Honor for 1924 given out by Photoplay Magazine,  the most prestigious American film award of its time.

Preservation status
Incomplete prints of the film, including some color-tinted and color-toned footage, exist in various film archives, including the National Film and Sound Archive and the Library of Congress.

See also
Cultural depictions of Abraham Lincoln
List of incomplete or partially lost films
List of actors who have played the President of the United States of America

References

External links

 
Progressive Silent Film List: The Dramatic Life of Abraham Lincoln at silentera.com
Theatrical advert for the New Lyric Theater in November 1924, announcing the film, which shares dual space with Circe, the Enchantress with Mae Murray

1924 films
Fictional depictions of Abraham Lincoln in film
Films directed by Phil Rosen
American Civil War films
First National Pictures films
American silent feature films
Films with screenplays by Frances Marion
American black-and-white films
American historical films
1920s historical films
Cultural depictions of John Wilkes Booth
Cultural depictions of Ulysses S. Grant
Cultural depictions of Robert E. Lee
Cultural depictions of Allan Pinkerton
Photoplay Awards film of the year winners
1920s American films